Bachia micromela is a species of lizard in the family Gymnophthalmidae. It is endemic to Brazil.

References

Bachia
Reptiles of Brazil
Endemic fauna of Brazil
Reptiles described in 2007
Taxa named by Miguel Trefaut Rodrigues
Taxa named by Dante Pavan
Taxa named by Felipe F. Curcio